Zero One was a British TV series that ran from 1962 to 1965. It starred Nigel Patrick and was produced Lawrence Bachmann.

It was a partnership between BBC and MGM-British. There were 39 episodes.

Margaret Rutherford starred in an episode entitled "The Liar", as Mrs Pendenny.

References

External links
Zero One at IMDb
Zero One at CTVA

1960s British television series
1962 British television series debuts
1965 British television series endings